İçerisu is a village in the Nurdağı District, Gaziantep Province, Turkey. It is populated by Turks and had a population of 474 in 2022. The village is also inhabited by Alevi or Bektashi Turkmens, who are locally known as Yalvaç and belong to the Sarı İsmail ocak.

References

Villages in Nurdağı District